The third season of the long-running Australian outback drama McLeod's Daughters began airing on 12 February 2003, and concluded on 29 October 2003, with a total of 30 episodes.

Cast

Regular
 Lisa Chappell as Claire McLeod
 Bridie Carter as Tess Silverman McLeod
 Jessica Napier as Becky Howard
 Rachael Carpani as Jodi Fountain
 Aaron Jeffery as Alex Ryan
 Myles Pollard as Nick Ryan
 Sonia Todd as Meg Fountain
 Simmone Jade Mackinnon as Stevie Hall

Recurring
 John Jarratt as Terry Dodge
 Marshall Napier as Harry Ryan
 Doris Younane as Moira Doyle
 Inge Hornstra as Sandra Kinsella
Ben Mortley as Alberto Borelli (episodes 1-6)
 Catherine Wilkin as Liz Ryan (episodes 1-10)
 Brett Tucker as Dave Brewer (episodes 1-25)
 Charlie Clausen as Jake Harrison (episodes 1-26)

Guest
Kathryn Hartman as Sally Clements
 Fletcher Humphrys as Brick Buchanon
Richard Healy as Kevin Fountain
 Rodger Corser as Peter Johnson

Notes

Episodes

Production
The third season of McLeod's Daughters was announced in June 2002, and went into production in September 2002. It was originally commissioned for 26 episodes, before being extended to 30 episodes. 

The season saw the departure of two of its leading characters – Jessica Napier and Lisa Chappell. Chappell was replaced with actress Simmone Jade Mackinnon in the role of Stevie Hall.

Reception

Ratings
On average, McLeod's Daughters received an audience of 1.50 million, and ranked at #6 for its third season. Episode 28, "My Noon, "My Midnight" was watched by 1,705,000 viewers.

Awards and nominations
The third season of McLeod's Daughters received four wins and six nominations at the 2004 Logie Awards. It also received one nomination at the 2004 AFI Awards. 

Wins
 Logie Award for Most Popular Actress (Lisa Chappell)
 Logie Award for Most Popular Actor (Aaron Jeffery)
 Logie Award for Most Popular Australian Program
 Logie Award for Most Popular Australian Drama Series

Nominations
 AFI Award for Best Television Drama Series
 Gold Logie Award for Most Popular Personality on Australian Television (Lisa Chappell)
 Logie Award for Most Popular Actress (Bridie Carter)
 Logie Award for Most Popular Actor (Myles Pollard)
 Logie Award for Most Popular New Female Talent (Simmone Jade Mackinnon)
 Logie Award for Most Outstanding Actress (Bridie Carter)
 Logie Award for Most Outstanding Drama Series

Home media

References

McLeod's Daughters seasons
2003 Australian television seasons